The Cardinal Greenway (TGC) is a multi-use recreational network combining a rail trail and an on-street route that together cross  and five counties — in east central Indiana.  The greenway, which was designated a National Recreation Trail in June 2003 and in 2018 was named to the Rails-to-Trails Conservancy's  "Rail Trail Hall of Fame."  uses the former CSX railroad track between Richmond and Marion. It is named after the Cardinal, the last regular passenger train service on the (Chicago-Cincinnati-Washington) route. Currently it is Indiana's longest rail trail project.

The route, which is dedicated to pedestrian, bicycle and equestrian users, has nine bridges and passes the historic Wysor Street Depot.  It also follow the White, Whitewater and Mississinewa Rivers. Marked in half-mile increments, the TGC has more than 20 trail heads, most with restrooms, parking areas, and interpretive markers.  The system hosts annual events including the National Trails Day (June/Running), Cardinal Greenways Bike Fest (July/biking), Walk Indiana (September/walking), and BikeTOURberfest (October/bicycle).

The Cardinal Greenway is part of the Northern Route of the American Discovery Trail. and connects to the White River Greenway near downtown Muncie.  A current expansion is underway to construct the White River Greenway trail in downtown Muncie. In Richmond, the trail connects to the Whitewater Gorge Trail and Gennett Walk of Fame in the Whitewater Gorge Park.

Background 
In 1993, volunteers organized an investigative meeting to study purchasing an abandoned rail line for a rails-to-trails conversion project.  Removal of the steel rails began in late 1992.  Work started in Marion and was completed from there through Richmond by June 1993.  Cardinal Greenway, Inc., a not-for-profit, was formed, purchasing  of the former railroad corridor from CSX Corporation in that same year (1993).
In 1996 a Master Plan was completed and final drawings were submitted to INDOT.

Groundbreaking took place in September 1997, marking the start of Phase 1, a   Muncie section from the Wysor Street Depot to County Road 534 East.
The  Jonesboro-Marion section and the  Richmond section were constructed sometime before 2003. The  Muncie-Gaston section was constructed around 2003.

In 2003, the Cardinal Greenway was designated a National Recreation Trail.

The  Losantville-Mt. Pleasant section was opened in a ribbon-cutting ceremony held in Losantville on April 19, 2007.  Governor Mitch Daniels helped cut the ribbon.

In 2008 the state governor announced grants which include work on the Richmond-to-Losantville section including the improvement of six bridges and the Sweetser Switch Trail Connector, linking the two trails along a defunct railroad corridor.

The trail is managed by Cardinal Greenway, Inc., formerly known as Delaware Greenways, Inc. The company is organized under federal tax regulations as a 501(c)(3) not-for-profit organization.

Route 
See: Cardinal Greenway Map
Cardinal Greenways is a private, not-for-profit organization that encompasses the Cardinal Greenway, White River Greenway, Historic Wysor Street Depot and Cardinal Equestrian Trail.

The Cardinal Greenway is the longest rail-trail in Indiana and spans 62 miles from Marion through Muncie to Richmond in East Central Indiana.

The trail starts in Richmond, travels through Wayne, Randolph, Henry, Delaware, and Grant counties, and ends in the town of Converse at the border between Grant and Miami Counties.

The trail is asphalt paved the entire way.

Richmond Section 
The trail begins with a  section on the north side of Richmond.  This is near  the Whitewater River.

This is the curviest segment of the former railroad corridor.

The Cardinal Greenway then travels into the heart of Muncie, bisecting with Wysor Street Depot in the middle.  Just to the north of the depot the Cardinal Greenway intersects the White River Greenway.

The trail continues out of Muncie to Gaston.

Gaston-Jonesboro Gap 
An  section of the former rail corridor, going from Gaston to Jonesboro and running through Fowlerton, is owned by private land owners.  Cardinal Greenways, Inc. states that a route “will be chosen using public roads to connect the two sections of Cardinal Greenway.”  IndianaTrails.org states that “[t]he county road route can be followed using Dan Henry-style pavement markers.”

(Jonesboro-) Marion Section 

The trail resumes in Jonesboro at East 10th Street.  From there it travels along the Mississinewa River until it crosses US-35/IN-22.  By East 4th Street in Jonesboro, there is a pedestrian bridge over the Mississinewa to the Eugene “Beaner” Linn Park, a  park in Gas City.

After crossing US-35/IN-22, the trail goes on into Marion, going by Hogin Park, through the short tunnel under South D Street, under “the bypass” (IN-9), and ending at South Miller Avenue.

Beyond Marion 
The trail is now (2022) joined to both Sweetser Switch and Converse Junction trail, ending in downtown Converse.

See also
 Cardinal Greenway Map.
 American Discovery Trail

References

External links
 Cardinal Greenway, Inc.
 Greenways Foundation, Inc.'s IndianaTrails.org
 Richmond Section
 Muncie Section
 Cardinal Greenway Shown on a Google Map
 American Trails Cardinal Greenway article
 Cardinal Greenway Wildflower Photographs Digital Media Repository, Ball State University Libraries

Rail trails in Indiana
American Discovery Trail
Protected areas of Wayne County, Indiana
Protected areas of Randolph County, Indiana
Protected areas of Henry County, Indiana
Protected areas of Delaware County, Indiana
Protected areas of Grant County, Indiana
Transportation in Wayne County, Indiana
Transportation in Randolph County, Indiana
Transportation in Henry County, Indiana
Transportation in Delaware County, Indiana
Transportation in Grant County, Indiana
National Recreation Trails in Indiana